Tanya Louise Reynolds (born 4 November 1991) is an English actress. She landed her first major role as a series regular on the Sky 1 comedy-drama Delicious (2016–2019). Reynolds gained further prominence for portraying Lily Iglehart on the Netflix comedy-drama Sex Education (2019–2021), where she was a part of the main cast in the first three series. Reynolds was named as one of Screen International's Stars of Tomorrow 2020.

Early life
Reynolds was born and raised in Hemel Hempstead, Hertfordshire. Her father was a builder and her mother was a sign writer. She is of half English and half Italian descent. Her first experience in acting was at the age of four in the school nativity.
Reynolds attended the Oxford School of Drama, after winning a fully-funded scholarship, and purportedly conceded that otherwise she would not have been able to afford the drama school fees. Reynolds graduated in 2015.

Career
Reynolds first appeared on screen in several short films, including Civilised People by UK comedy duo In Cahoots, which was shown at the Edinburgh Festival Fringe in August 2015, The Jealous Boyfriend, also by In Cahoots, and Introducing Lucy. In 2016, Reynolds landed her first TV appearance in Delicious, where she played Teresa Benelli for 12 episodes.

2017 saw Reynolds furthering her TV career, with parts in Outlander, playing Lady Isobel Dunsany, and in the BBC thriller series Rellik, as 20 year old Sally. The same year she starred as Pearl Marston in the BBC crime drama Death in Paradise in the episode: Murder from Above shown in January 2018.

In 2018, Reynolds was a leading actor in the feature film Fanny Lye Deliver'd, among a cast that included Charles Dance and Maxine Peake. She also played a leading role as Teresa in the Sky One comedy Delicious, alongside a cast which included Iain Glen and Dawn French.

In 2019, starred as Lily Iglehart in the Netflix comedy-drama Sex Education, in later series her recurring role was changed to a main role for two more seasons. Reynolds stars as Mrs. Elton in a 2020 film remake of Jane Austen's Emma, alongside Anya Taylor-Joy and Bill Nighy.

Reynolds was named as one of Screen International's  Stars of Tomorrow 2020, which showcases talent within the television and film industry of Great Britain and Ireland.

In 2021, Reynolds got the chance to play Queen Victoria in the NBCUniversal series Dodger, alongside Christopher Eccleston as Fagin and David Threlfall as Chief of Police.

Filmography

References

External links
 

21st-century English actresses
Actresses from Hertfordshire
Alumni of the Oxford School of Drama
English film actresses
English television actresses
Living people
People from Hemel Hempstead
1991 births